The 2023 Penn State Nittany Lions men's volleyball team represents Pennsylvania State University in the 2023 NCAA Division I & II men's volleyball season. The Nittany Lions, led by 29th year head coach Mark Pavlik, play their home games at Rec Hall. The Nittany Lions are members of the Eastern Intercollegiate Volleyball Association and were picked to win the EIVA in the preseason poll.

Roster

Schedule

 *-Indicates conference match.
 Times listed are Eastern Time Zone.

Broadcasters
Ohio State: Greg Franke & Hanna Williford
Daemen: No commentary
Merrimack: Dylan Price & Thomas English 
Pepperdine: Rob Espero & Bill Walton 
Stanford: Rob Espero & Bill Walton
Long Beach State: 
USC: 
UCLA: 
St. Francis: 
Princeton: 
Princeton: 
NJIT: 
NJIT: 
Concordia Irvine: 
UC Irvine: 
Hawai'i: 
St. Francis: 
Ohio State: 
Harvard: 
Harvard: 
George Mason: 
George Mason: 
Charleston: 
Charleston:

Rankings 

^The Media did not release a Pre-season or Week 1 poll.

Honors
Owen Rose won the National Middle Attacker of the Week award for Week 0 games.

References

2023 in sports in Pennsylvania
2023 NCAA Division I & II men's volleyball season
2023 team
Penn State